The 2010 TCU Horned Frogs baseball team represented Texas Christian University in the 2010 NCAA Division I baseball season. The Horned frogs were coached by Jim Schlossnagle, in his 7th season with the Horned Frogs, and played home games at Lupton Stadium.

Schedule and results

Notes

References

TCU
TCU Horned Frogs baseball seasons
TCU Horned Frogs baseball
TCU
College World Series seasons